Geocentrophora is a genus of flatworms belonging to the family Prorhynchidae.

The species of this genus are found in Europe and Northern America.

Species:
 Geocentrophora applanata (Kennel, 1888) 
 Geocentrophora baltica (Kennel, 1883)

References

Platyhelminthes